Goole Association Football Club is a semi-professional  football club in Goole, East Riding of Yorkshire, England.

History
The club was established by Mike Norman in 1997 as a replacement for Goole Town, which folded at the end of the 1995–96 season. The new club joined the Premier Division of the Central Midlands League and went on to win the division at the first attempt, losing only one league match all season, earning promotion to the Supreme Division. The following season saw the club win the Wakefield Floodlit Cup and the League Cup. A third-place finish also saw them gain promotion into Division One of the Northern Counties East League.

In Goole's first season in the Northern Counties East League they won both the Wilkinson Sword Trophy and the Division One title, earning promotion to the Premier Division. In 2004–05 the club won the Premier Division, earning promotion to Division One of the Northern Premier League. In 2006–07 they won the West Riding County Cup. League restructuring at the end of the season saw the club placed in Division One South for the 2007–08 season, and they remained in the division until being transferred to Division One North in 2012. Although they were moved back to Division One South the following season, the club were transferred to Division One North again in 2016. After finishing second-from-bottom of the division in 2016–17 the club were due to be relegated until being reprieved when Ilkeston were excluded from the league.

The 2017–18 season saw Goole finish bottom of Division One North, resulting in relegation to the Premier Division of the Northern Counties East League.

The 2018/19 season saw the Vikings back in the Northern Counties East League Premier Division where they achieved an 18th place finish.

The 2019/20 and 2020/21 seasons were ultimately curtailed by the COVID-19 pandemic, with the Vikings finishing 17th and 14th respectively.

The 2021/22 season heralded a welcome return of football at the Victoria Pleasure Grounds, and gave the management team of Mick Carmody and Alan Jackson, a much-anticipated chance of getting back in the dugout, and the players chance to get back playing. 
Their first full season in charge saw the Vikings finishing a very respectable 12th in the table. 

The 2022/23 season started off brightly, with the Vikings recording a 1-0 away victory at  Yorkshire Amateur on the opening day of the season.

They also embarked on a successful FA Cup run, starting off with a superb 4-1 home win over Northern Premier League side Consett, in the Extra Preliminary Round. 

This was quickly followed by long trip up to Carlisle, to take on  Carlisle City, in the FA Cup Preliminary round, where at a rainy Gillford Park, the Vikings put in another superb performance to see off their hosts 3-2 and reach the FA Cup First Qualifying Round.

The Vikings were drawn at home, taking on another side from the Northern Premier League, this time it was Prescot Cables FC who would be making the trip across the M62.

Ultimately, the Vikings FA Cup adventure came to an end, as they lost that game 1-0. 

The Vikings league form took a turn for the worst, with a sequence of losses, interspersed with a couple of draws.

On Saturday 22nd October, a painful 7-0 home defeat against Garforth Town heralded the end of Mick and Jacko's time in charge, as they both resigned after the Game. 

A two-game spell with Josh Schofield overseeing First team affairs followed. 

On Tuesday 2nd November, the Club announced that former Shaw Lane Aquaforce and Pontefract Collieries Manager, Simon Houghton had been appointed as the Clubs New Manager.

On Saturday 18th March 2023, following a 2-0 home loss against relegation rivals Bottesford Town, the club parted company with Manager Simon Houghton, by mutual consent.

Non-playing staff
Chairman: Alan Wilson
Vice Chairman: Nigel Emery
Club Secretary: Connor Walker
First Team Manager: Position vacant 
Assistant manager: Leon Sewell
Head coach: Greg Beswick
First Team coach: Josh Schofield 
Goalkeeping coach:
Sports Therapist: Callum Sellars

Honours
Northern Counties East League
Premier Division champions 2004–05
Division One champions 1999–2000
League Trophy winners 1999–2000
Central Midlands League
Premier Division champions 1997–98
League Cup winners 1998–99
West Riding County Cup
Winners 2006–07
Wakefield Floodlit Cup
Winners 1998–99

Records
Best FA Cup performance: Second qualifying round, 2000–01, 2005–06
Best FA Trophy performance: Second qualifying round, 2005–06, 2014–15
Best FA Vase performance: Fourth round, 1998–99
Record attendance: 976 vs Leeds United, friendly match, 1999
Most goals: Kevin Severn (1997–2001)

See also
Goole A.F.C. players
Goole A.F.C. managers

References

External links

Official website

 
Football clubs in England
Football clubs in the East Riding of Yorkshire
1997 establishments in England
Association football clubs established in 1997
Goole
Central Midlands Football League
Northern Counties East Football League
Northern Premier League clubs